John Wesley Harper (August 5, 1893 – June 18, 1927) was an American pitcher in Major League Baseball.

He was born in Hendricks, West Virginia, and died in Halstead, Kansas.

Sources

1893 births
1927 deaths
Akron Buckeyes players
Baseball players from West Virginia
Dallas Steers players
Dallas Submarines players
Greensboro Patriots players
Major League Baseball pitchers
Marshall Thundering Herd baseball players
Newark Bears (IL) players
People from Tucker County, West Virginia
Philadelphia Athletics players
Raleigh Capitals players
San Antonio Bronchos players
Syracuse Stars (minor league baseball) players